Conservation Council may refer to:

Conservation Council of Nations, international network created by the International Conservation Caucus Foundation
Conservation Council of South Australia, or Conservation SA, peak body for conservation groups in South Australia
Conservation Council of Western Australia, peak body for conservation groups in Western Australia
Environment Victoria, formerly Conservation Council of Victoria, peak body for conservation groups in Victoria, Australia

See also
Nature Conservation Council, a former New Zealand government agency
Nature Conservancy Council, a former British government agency